The Com-Pac 16 is an American trailerable sailboat that was designed by Clark Mills as a small cruiser and first built in 1972.

The design was superseded in production by the Com-Pac Legacy in 2006.

Production
The design was built by Com-Pac Yachts in the United States, starting in 1972. Over 2,800 boats were completed, but it is now out of production.

Design
The Com-Pac 16 is a recreational keelboat, built predominantly of fiberglass, with teak wood trim. It has a 7/8 fractional sloop rig with anodized aluminum spars and a bowsprit. The hull has a spooned plumb stem, a vertical transom, a transom-hung rudder controlled by a tiller and a fixed fin, shoal-draft keel.

The design has sleeping accommodation for two people in two  berths. The head is a portable type. Ventilation is provided by a single foredeck hatch. Stowage space includes a lazarette.

For sailing the design may be equipped with either a working jib or a genoa. It has jiffy reefing, navigation lights, a stainless steel pulpit, a boarding ladder and a self-bailing cockpit.

The design has a PHRF racing average handicap of 326. It is normally raced with a crew of two sailors.

Variants
Com-Pac 16
This model was introduced in 1971.
Com-Pac 16 Mark II
This model was introduced in 1975.

Operational history
In a 1994 review Richard Sherwood described the design as, "a small, trailerable cruiser with a fixed, shoal draft keel."

See also
List of sailing boat types

References

External links

Keelboats
1970s sailboat type designs
Sailing yachts
Trailer sailers
Sailboat type designs by Clark Mills
Sailboat types built by Com-Pac Yachts